Shah Jewna, also known as Pir Shah Jewna Al-Naqvi Al-Bukhari was a 16th century great saint. Jewna was a Sayyid from the Naqvi denomination.  He was born in Kannauj in 895 A.H. (1493 A.D.). His father Syed Sadarudin Shah Kabir Naqvi Al Bukhari was direct descendant of Jalaluddin Surkh-Posh Bukhari, also the chief advisor of King Sikandar Lodi.

Shah Jewna's forefather Makhdoom Syed Jalaluddin Surkh Bukhari's father Abu Moweed married the daughter of Wali Turan Mehmood Bin Bafra Saljoqi. After him, Makhdoom Syed Jalaluddin Surkh Bukhari was also married to the princess of Bukhara who gave birth to two sons named Syed Ali and Syed Jaffar.

After the death of Makhdoom Jahanian Jahangast the ancestors of Shah Jewana's Sadats moved to Kannauj (India) to preach Islam. Shah Jewna’s colonized towns in Kannauj :-Siray- e-Miraan, Bibiyaan Jalalpur, Makhdoom Pur, Laal Pur (associated with the name of Saint Jalaluddin Surkh-Posh Bukhari or Laal Bukhari).

Jewna migrated from Kannauj to Shah Jeewna (a town named after him), which was deserted until he settled there. Makhdoom Jahaniya Mosque is still present in Kannauj. Pir Shah Jewna died in the year 971 A.H. (1569 A.D.) during the reign of the Mughal Emperor Jalal-ud-din Akbar. At that time, Fareed-ud-din Bukhari was in power in Punjab and Syed Abdul Wahab Bukhari in Delhi. It is said that all these great saints were the close relatives of Shah Jewna, so they along with Emperor Akbar might have attended the funerals of Pir Shah Jewna and also used to pay visit to this great saint. Jewna's descendants are still present in various places of India and Pakistan.

References 

1493 births
1569 deaths
People from Kannauj
Indian Sufi saints
People from Bukhara
16th-century Indian Muslims
People from Jhang District